Zandra Nowell (born 10 September 1936) is a British alpine skier. She competed in two events at the 1956 Winter Olympics.

References

1936 births
Living people
British female alpine skiers
Olympic alpine skiers of Great Britain
Alpine skiers at the 1956 Winter Olympics
Sportspeople from Northwich